Giovanni Federico (born 4 October 1980) is a German former professional footballer who played as an attacking midfielder.

Playing career 
Federico was born in Hagen, North Rhine-Westphalia. He agreed to join Borussia Dortmund from Karlsruher SC for 2007–08 on a Bosman transfer on 7 March 2007, after a highly successful season, individually (top goalscorer with 19 goals) and collectively (his team achieved promotion with the first place in 2. Bundesliga).
He returned to Karlsruhe on loan in the 2008–09 winter transfer window on loan. After Karlsruhe were relegated at the end of the 2008–09 season, Federico originally returned to Borussia Dortmund, but was signed by Arminia Bielefeld on 10 July. After one year with Arminia Bielefeld, he announced his return to VfL Bochum and signed on 10 June 2010. When Federico ended his professional career in Bochum in 2012, he had amassed 62 goals at the top two levels of the German football pyramid.

Managerial career
In October 2016, Federico returned to his former childhood club, SSV Hagen, where he was appointed player-manager. He left the club at his own request in February 2018 because would like to devote himself to other tasks in the future.

Career statistics

References

External links
 
 

1980 births
Living people
Sportspeople from Hagen
Association football midfielders
VfL Bochum players
VfL Bochum II players
1. FC Köln players
1. FC Köln II players
Karlsruher SC players
Borussia Dortmund players
Borussia Dortmund II players
Arminia Bielefeld players
FC Viktoria Köln players
German footballers
Italian footballers
German sportspeople of Italian descent
Bundesliga players
2. Bundesliga players
Footballers from North Rhine-Westphalia